Cleddau may refer to:
River Cleddau, a river in Pembrokeshire, Wales
Cleddau Estuary/Daugleddau, at the mouth of the River Cleddau
Cleddau Bridge, crossing over the Cleddau Estuary